Loxofidonia cingala is a moth of the family Geometridae first described by Frederic Moore in 1887. It is found in Sri Lanka.

Host plants of the caterpillar include Impatiens balsamina and Camellia sinensis.

References

Moths of Asia
Moths described in 1887